Greenbrier High School is a public high school located in Greenbrier, Tennessee, United States. It is part of Robertson County Schools. The school educates about 800 students in grades 9 to 12.

2017 bomb threat
On March 6, 2017, three Robertson County Schools, Springfield High School, Robertson County Alternative School, and Greenbrier High School, received bomb threats. Students were evacuated and all three schools were searched, however no bombs were found. The caller was identified as Austin Holliman, an 18-year-old, who attended the Robertson County Alternative School but previously attended Greenbrier High School. He was later booked into the Robertson County Jail.

Clubs and athletics
Greenbrier High School has many clubs, sports, and activities which include:
Football
Basketball Men and Women's
Baseball
Soccer Men and Women's
Cheerleading
Golf
Tennis 
Softball
Volleyball
Wrestling
Bowling
Cross Country
Track

And there is also a school band

References

Educational institutions in the United States with year of establishment missing
Public high schools in Tennessee
Schools in Robertson County, Tennessee